David Uhl is an American artist who specializes in oil paintings of vintage Harley-Davidson motorcycles and is known for his Women of Harley-Davidson collection.

Career
David Uhl was born in Toledo, Ohio, on September 20, 1961, and was raised in Luna Pier, Michigan, where he was one of seven children. He attended high school at St. John's Jesuit High School and Academy in Toledo. When Uhl was in high school, he planned to become a marine biologist. During classes, he had a habit of creating images with his ballpoint pen while taking notes. Eventually, he started selling his pictures to his classmates. In 1979, Uhl applied for and received the only full-ride scholarship offered to a high school senior in the United States to the Colorado Institute of Art (CIA). Uhl left the institute before completing his studies and became a freelance illustrator. His clients included Coca-Cola, Apple, IBM, Federal Express, and Time magazine. He and Danial James Stuckenschneider founded Uhl Studios LLC in 1989.

Uhl's artistic focus started to shift after he purchased his first motorcycle in 1988 and was exposed to the culture of motorcycle enthusiasts during a ride to The Sturgis Motorcycle Rally in South Dakota. While attending a dealer meeting in Boston, Uhl presented Harley officials with an image of the Harley Motors symbol superimposed on Mount Rushmore. As a result, Uhl landed an account creating images for Harley T-shirts in 1993. He became Harley-Davidson's first licensed oil painter in 1998.

Uhl has become known for using black and white photos from the Harley-Davidson photo archive to create painted images of the company's motorcycles with accurate colors and mechanical details. In 2013, he was commissioned by both Harley-Davidson and the Vatican to create paintings commemorating Harley-Davidson's 110th anniversary celebration in Rome. Uhl presented the piece Chance Encounter to Pope Francis and the Vatican during a private meeting. The painting depicts a group of clergy noticing a 1948 Harley-Davidson FL panhead while walking in St. Peter's Square and is now part of the Vatican's art collection. The image is also sold as a commemorative postcard with a Pope Francis stamp. The Vatican Post Office designed a mark for the postcard based on Uhl's painting.

By 2013, Uhl had painted between 400 and 500 images depicting Harley-Davidson motorcycles. He has been described as the "Norman Rockwell of Harley-Davidson artists" by Charles Osgood of CBS Sunday Morning.

Collectors of Uhl's work include Aerosmith lead singer Steven Tyler and former Tonight Show host Jay Leno. In 2013, Uhl created a painting of Tyler riding through a crowd of paparazzi on a motorcycle. The Reckoning was made available as a limited-edition print to benefit DonorsChoose, an online charity that connects the requests of teachers in high-need communities with donors who want to help.

Uhl also has created archival paintings for Shelby American and has done work on the history of wine making in Napa Valley, California.  He was selected in 2011 to design the program cover for the 100th running of the Indy 500 on May 29, 2011. His painting was inspired by a 1911 photo of the car race.

Exhibits and collections
Uhl launched his Women of Harley-Davidson collection in 1998 and adds a new painting every two years. His latest addition, Jessi, inspired by women who served in the U.S. Navy during World War II, was released in 2014.

Uhl's artwork is displayed at Doubletake Gallery in Burnsville, Minnesota, and at David Uhl Studio in Golden, Colorado.

His work has been in exhibits at the Marietta/Cobb Museum in Marietta, Georgia; Shelby American Museum in Boulder, Colorado; Antique Automobile Club of America Museum in Hershey, Pennsylvania; The Wheels Through Time Museum in Maggie Valley, North Carolina; Indianapolis Motor Speedway Museum in Indianapolis, Indiana; Harley-Davidson Museum in Milwaukee, Wisconsin; Rocky Mountain Motorcycle Museum in Colorado Springs, Colorado; National WASP Museum, Sweetwater, Texas; Legends Vintage Motorcycle Museum, Springville, Utah; National Motorcycle Museum, Anamosa, Iowa; Sturgis Motorcycle Museum, Sturgis, South Dakota; Chandler Vintage Museum of Transportation and Wildlife, Oxnard, California; and American Motorcycle Association Hall of Fame Museum, Pickerington, Ohio.

Personal life
Uhl lives and works in Golden, Colorado, and is married to Elizabeth Uhl. They have two children, Isabella and Sterling.

Paintings

References

Living people
Artists from Toledo, Ohio
Motorcycling mass media people
20th-century American painters
People from Golden, Colorado
1961 births
People from Monroe County, Michigan
21st-century American painters